Robina Blakelock (born 21 February 1944) is a British former tennis player. Starting in 1963, she competed under her married name, Robin Lloyd, and was remarried in 1970 to Australian player Graham Primrose.

Active in the 1960s, Blakelock grew up in Sussex. She was a British junior champion and as a 19-year old came close to beating Angela Mortimer, holding a match point against her in the 1962 Brighton final. Her best Wimbledon performances included a singles third round appearance in 1965 and All England Plate runner-up finish in 1966. She was a women's doubles semi-finalist at the 1968 Wimbledon Championships with Frances MacLennan.

References

External links
 
 

1944 births
Living people
British female tennis players
English female tennis players